Brian Hirsch (born 1973) is a New York-based venture capitalist (active since 1997). Hirsch is the co-founder of Tribeca Venture Partners, a, New York City based venture capital firm.  Hirsch was previously the founder of Greenhill SAVP, the venture arm of Greenhill & Co. (NYSE: GHL).

Hirsch was previously a Principal at Sterling Partners and a vice president with ABN AMRO Private Equity.

Hirsch has a bachelor's degree in Economics and American Studies from Brandeis University.  He is married with two children and lives in New York City.

References

Businesspeople from New York (state)
Brandeis University alumni
Living people
1973 births